The MKM Stadium (also known as the Hull City Stadium due to UEFA sponsorship regulations) is a multi-purpose facility in the city of Kingston upon Hull, England. The stadium was previously called the KC Stadium, but was renamed the KCOM Stadium as part of a major rebrand by the stadium's sponsor KCOM, on 4 April 2016. In June 2021, it was renamed the MKM Stadium as part of a five-year sponsorship with MKM Building Supplies. Conceived in the late 1990s, it was completed in 2002 at a cost of approximately £44 million. The stadium is owned by Hull City Council and operated by the Stadium Management Company (SMC), who have previously considered expanding the stadium capacity up to 32,000.

The bowl-shaped stadium contains a continuous single tier of seats with a second tier on the west side. Its current capacity is 25,400. The stadium hosts two tenants, association football club Hull City A.F.C., which moved there from Boothferry Park, and rugby league football club Hull FC, relocated from the Boulevard. It is also the largest rugby league stadium in England. The ground also hosts international association football and rugby league football competitions and acts as a venue for concerts by musical artists, such as Elton John and The Who.

History

The idea of a new stadium for Kingston upon Hull, whose professional football club Hull City had played at Boothferry Park since 1946, was first mooted in 1997, but funds to finance such a project only became available when the city council sold a portion of its holdings in Kingston Communications. The council provided most of the funds, more than £42 million, with the rest stemming from government single regeneration budget grants and from the Football Stadium Improvement Fund.

The council appointed John Topliss to head the stadium construction project. He and his team partnered with consulting firm Drivers Jonas to explore preliminary issues such as stadium location, seating capacity, and facilities offered. Stated Mr. Topliss: "We had a totally blank canvas and, working with consultants, made a thorough assessment of what was needed."

The project team considered over a dozen sites, inside and outside of the city, before settling on The Circle in West Park. Factors contributing to the decision include transport guidance, central government planning guidelines, existing athletic facilities, isolation from residential areas, and council ownership. The stadium site is located around 100m from the original Hull City, 'Circle' Stadium which was the home of the club from 1906.

The final recommendation of Drivers Jonas included additional facilities for both indoor and outdoor sports for the people of West Hull in addition to the main stadium, planned to seat from 25,000 to 30,000 spectators. Professional services firm Arup Associates provided initial concept proposals for the stadium. The Miller Partnership, an architectural and interior design firm, adopted these proposals during the stadium's design. The construction work was undertaken by Birse Group.

In spite of obstacles during the course of the project, including Hull City A.F.C.'s receivership in 2001 (just after the granting of planning permission), the stadium complex was completed on time (in fourteen months) and on budget (at approximately £44 million). The stadium opened its doors on 18 December 2002. Hull City beat Sunderland A.F.C. 1–0 in a friendly match to mark the occasion. Steve Melton scored the goal, the first at the KC Stadium.

Due to the unavailability of its usual venue of Old Trafford, the stadium hosted the 2020 Super League Grand Final.

Structure and facilities
The all-seater stadium consists of a single-tier, asymmetrical bowl that can seat approximately 20,000, with a second tier on the stadium's west stand that can seat approximately 5,000. Current capacity is 25,586. Plans provide for future expansion to a capacity of approximately 30,000 by the addition of a second tier on the stadium's east stand. Each stand has a name for corporate sponsorship purposes. On 4 July 2011, Hull City revealed that the stadium's west stand would be sponsored by the local Cranswick plc under a two-year agreement, which was extended on 26 July 2013.
On 10 July 2013 it was announced the east stand would be sponsored by Ideal Standard and become known as the Ideal Standard Community East Stand. The stand was renamed the Chris Chilton Stand, in honour of Hull City's all-time record goalscorer, Chris Chilton, ahead of the home fixture against West Bromwich Albion on 5 March 2022.

Corporate hospitality is provided by 28 executive boxes located between the two tiers of the Cranswick plc West Stand,  while security of the stadium is handled using 57 closed-circuit television (CCTV) cameras that cover the stadium. Over the summer of 2007, SMC installed an LED screen in the Smith & Nephew North Stand to replace the old electronic scoreboard. The screen has an area of approximately 40 m2 (430 ft.2) and displays such content as live home game feeds, match highlights, interviews, and action replays.

The stadium's seats are mostly black, with a band of white and amber seats around the circumference. White and amber seats form the word Hull in the north and south stands. In the Ideal Standard Community East Stand, the seats form an image of a coronet, a symbol of the city that also appears in the club crest for Hull F.C. and in the coat of arms of the city council. Black, white, and amber were chosen to remain neutral toward the colours of its two tenants: black and white for Hull F.C. and black and amber for Hull City A.F.C. The blue and gold of owner Hull City Council appear in the stadium's four external columns.

The size of the playing surface is 114 x 74 metres (125 x 81 yd) and made of rye grass with a 3% additive of artificial grass. This provides ample room for a FIFA-regulation association football pitch of 105 x 68 metres (115 x 74 yd) and a standard rugby league football pitch of 100 x 68 metres (109 x 74 yd). The playing surface has an automated watering system and below-surface heating.

Set within Hull's West Park, the stadium is the first in England to be built in a parkland setting. The stadium complex also includes the 1,500 seat Bonus Arena, a skate park, two multi-use all-weather pitches, a community learning zone complete with classrooms, a health & fitness suite, a cyber cafe, and a library.

The MKM Stadium has received several honours. It was named the chief new development in Yorkshire at the Royal Institution of Chartered Surveyors Pro-Yorkshire Awards. It was also on the shortlist for the Prime Minister's Award for Better Public Building and received a high commendation in the British Construction Industry Awards in the Best Value category. In a 2005 poll that was carried out by Drivers Jonas and decided by football fans from across the country, the KC Stadium was rated highest in comfort, services and view among all grounds in the Football League and was also rated the most-improved venue.

On 13 August 2013 a Goal Decision System by Hawk-Eye was installed in the ground ahead of the 2013–14 Premier League season which requires the use of goal-line technology to indicate if a goal is scored.

On 25 June 2021, it was announced that local based building supplies firm MKM Building Supplies Ltd. had agreed a five-year sponsorship deal for the stadium and it was renamed the MKM Stadium.

Tenants

Hull City

The stadium replaced Boothferry Park as home to Hull City Association Football Club, and was the backdrop for the club's recent climb through the English Football League. It first hosted the club's home games during the second half of the 2002–03 season; the first competitive match was against Hartlepool United, a game that Hull City won by a score of 2–0. Hull City, nicknamed the Tigers, attracted an average attendance of almost 17,000 in their first full season at the KC Stadium, 2003–04. This figure is more than three times the average Third Division attendance for that season, and was only matched or exceeded by clubs in the Premier League and the First Division. However, the level of support was not matched by on-field performances; the Tigers finished 13th in their first season at the KC Stadium. However, in 2003–04 (their first full season at the new ground), Hull won promotion as Third Division runners-up, securing their place in the newly named League One (previously the Second Division). A second successive promotion to the Championship, again as runners-up, followed in 2004–05.

Attendances for Hull City's league games at the MKM Stadium have averaged above 16,000 in each full season they have played there, apart from the 2017–18 and 2018–19 seasons. The stadium hosted Premier League football in the 2008–09 and 2009–10 seasons, with all 20,500 available season tickets selling out shortly after Hull City's Championship play-off victory at Wembley Stadium. The record attendance for a Premier League match is 25,030 set on 9 May 2010 for the last match of the season against Liverpool
beating the previous record of 25,023 set on 13 March 2010 against Arsenal. While playing in the Championship, the record stood at 24,350 on 26 April 2008 for the visit of Crystal Palace, beating that of 24,311 on 30 January 2007 for the visit of local rivals Leeds United. Segregation between home fans and away fans prevents the stadium's stated capacity from being reached.

Plans have been prepared for the potential extension of the stadium following Hull City's promotion to the Premier League. 4,500 seats could be added in a second tier to the east stand, and 2,000 seats each in the north and south stands, giving the stadium a capacity of approximately 34,000. In 2011, the club's owner Assem Allam announced that he wanted to buy the stadium freehold so he could develop, as he stated, "a sports park" on the site.

After Hull City Council refused, Allam stated "I had in mind £30 million to spend on the infrastructure of the club, to increase the stadium by 10,000 and to have commercial activities around the stadium – cafeterias, shops, supermarkets – to have all this to create income for the club so that in the future it can be self-financing and not relying on me."

On 9 August 2013, Allam announced that the club will discard its 109-year-old name and, henceforth, be "marketed" as Hull City Tigers locally and Hull Tigers to national and international audiences. Announcing the change in the Hull Daily Mail newspaper, he  said: "'Hull City' is irrelevant...it is common. I want the club to be special. It is about identity. 'City' is a lousy identity. 'Hull City Association Football Club' is so long." The club's Managing Director Nick Thompson urged supporters "to judge it in the fullness of time." The announcement stated that all references to "AFC" on club branding will be phased out, although they will remain on the shirt crest during their first season back in the Premier League.

Allam dismissed fans' protests against the name change, stating "nobody questions my decisions in my business."

Hull F.C.

Professional rugby league's Hull Football Club play their home games at the MKM Stadium, having moved from the Boulevard. During their time at the MKM Stadium, they have consistently ended each season on a high note: in 2003, the team just missed play-off qualification; in 2004, the club finished third. They finished fourth in 2005, and enjoyed even greater success in the Challenge Cup, in which they beat the Leeds Rhinos in the final. Hull F.C. reached the Super League Grand Final in 2006. Attendances average around 14,000, but are often well above that figure when the club hosts local rivals Hull Kingston Rovers, this local derby producing a record crowd of 23,004 for 2 September 2007 fixture.

Rugby League Test Matches
List of test, league and International tournament matches played at MKM Stadium since its opening in 2002.

Other sporting events
It hosted five England under-21 internationals. The results were as follows.

The MKM Stadium is now also a regular venue for international rugby league games, and has hosted Great Britain matches in both the Tri-Nations and the Ashes competitions. The stadium hosted the 2004 Tri-Nations match in which New Zealand lost by a score of 26–24. The stadium also hosted the Tri-Nations game between Great Britain and Australia in 2005; the final score was 26–14 to Australia.

On Saturday 9 November 2013, the stadium hosted the England versus Fiji Rugby League World Cup match, in which England won 34–12 in front of an attendance of 25,114. Before the match, there was a minute's silence, followed by spontaneous applause, to mark the early death of former England International Steve Prescott.

In 2009, the KC Stadium was shortlisted as a possible venue for games at the 2018 FIFA World Cup should England win the right to host it, but when the list of venues was announced on 16 December that year, the KC Stadium was not included.

It has also played host to two exhibition Twenty20 cricket matches between Yorkshire County Cricket Club and Lashings World XI.

Concerts
As well as serving as a sporting venue, the MKM Stadium also hosts musical events, including such artists as Sir Elton John, Bryan Adams, Neil Diamond, R.E.M., Bon Jovi, and The Who.

JLS have also performed here in front of 20,000 fans as part of their 2010 JLS Tour.

Rod Stewart performed at the stadium on 14 June 2016 and Jeff Lynne's ELO played at the stadium on 1 July 2017.

Gallery

Notes

References

External links

 

Rugby league stadiums in England
Rugby League World Cup stadiums
Football venues in England
Hull City A.F.C.
Hull F.C.
Premier League venues
Sports venues in Kingston upon Hull
Squash venues
Sports venues completed in 2002
2002 establishments in England
English Football League venues